William Tearle (1852 - 23 March 1922) was the first manager of Singapore Railway from its opening in 1903 to his retirement in 1907.

Biography
Tearle was born in 1852 in England, and when he was young, went to the West Indies, spending three years in sugar planting. He then returned to England and became an employee of the Leeds Northern Railway, later becoming the stationmaster at Keighley and Halifax. After spending 21 years working for the Leeds Northern Railway, he went to Malaysia and became the traffic superintendent of the Selangor Government Railway. Sometime either before or around this, he married a woman.

Tearle was appointed the manager of the Singapore Railway in 1903, during which he lived along Fort Canning Road, near then terminal Tank Road station. He retired from his position in November 1907 and moved to Bedford with his wife. Tearle died on 23 March 1922 due to his deteriorating health, while his wife died on 26 December 1935 in Yorkshire.

References

1852 births
1922 deaths